WBGD (91.9 FM) was a high school radio station based in Brick Township, New Jersey, started at Brick Township High School and later broadcast from Brick Memorial High School.  The station went on the air in the 1970s as a 10-watt educational licensed station playing a variety of music formats. There were such shows as DJ Rock and Wilty and the Snake and The CEVO Nedved Show.

Silent
The station experienced transmitter problems in 2007 and went off the air due to a lack of funds to make the necessary repairs. As of September 1, 2010, the license has officially been forfeited to the FCC.

External links
On the Radio: WBGD 91.9 FM

Brick Township, New Jersey
BGD
High school radio stations in the United States
Radio stations disestablished in 2010
Defunct radio stations in the United States
2010 disestablishments in New Jersey
BGD
1974 establishments in New Jersey
Radio stations established in 1974